Tomopleura subtilinea is a species of sea snail, a marine gastropod mollusk in the family Borsoniidae.

Description
The length of the shell attains 23 mm, its width 8 mm.

(Original description) The shell is rather large and solid, cylindro-conic, tapering evenly. It contains 10 whorls. Its colour is uniform grey.

Sculpture :—On the penultimate whorl are five larger and five smaller spirals. On the body whorl are twenty-five spirals, of which seven are on the snout, besides uncounted threads, one in each of the broader furrows. Numerous close-set radial threads lattice the spaces between the main spirals, but do not cross them. Three spirals run along the fasciole, the outer rows of radial bars there contained are set in chevron. The aperture is pyriform. The outer lip is simple. The notch on the shoulder is rather deeply incised.

Distribution
This marine species is endemic to Australia and occurs off New South Wales and Queensland

References

 Laseron, C. 1954. Revision of the New South Wales Turridae (Mollusca). Australian Zoological Handbook. Sydney : Royal Zoological Society of New South Wales 1–56, pls 1–12.
 Wilson, B. 1994. Australian Marine Shells. Prosobranch Gastropods. Kallaroo, WA : Odyssey Publishing Vol. 2 370 pp.

External links
 

subtilinea
Gastropods of Australia
Gastropods described in 1918